Tykhe is a village in Ukraine, Odesa Raion, Odesa Oblast. It belongs to Usatove rural hromada, one of the hromadas of Ukraine, and is one of the 15 villages in the hromada. It has a population of 51. Tykhe was formed because of the Constituency 139.

Previously, Tykhe was called as Chapayeve. You can call Tykhe as: Chapaeve, Chapayeve, Chapayevo, and Tikhe.  The name means 'quiet', the former one referred to Vasily Chapayev.

Until 18 July 2020, Tykhe belonged to Biliaivka Raion. The raion was abolished in July 2020 as part of the administrative reform of Ukraine, which reduced the number of raions of Odesa Oblast to seven. The area of Biliaivka Raion was merged into Odesa Raion.

Population census 

As of January 12, 1989, Chapayeve had a population 27. 12 men and 15 women. 

As of December 5, 2001, Chapayeve had a popultaion of 39.

Language Distribution 
Tykhe only has 2 native languages.

See also 
Usatove

References

Villages in Odesa Raion
Usatove Hromada